Leslie Haden-Guest, 1st Baron Haden-Guest,  (10 March 1877 – 20 August 1960) was a British author, journalist, doctor and Labour Party politician.

Early life
Haden-Guest was born in Oldham, Lancashire, England, the son of Catharine Anna (née Johnson) and Alexander Haden-Guest, a doctor and surgeon of Manchester who was an active worker for the left. He was educated first at William Hulme's Grammar School, then studied medicine at Owens College, Manchester and the London Hospital.

Career
Haden-Guest served in the Royal Army Medical Corps in the Boer War, World War I, and World War II, being awarded the Military Cross. He was the founder of the Anglo-French Committee of the Red Cross. He was a member of the London County Council for Woolwich East (1919–1922).

He was a Labour Member of Parliament (MP) for Southwark North from 1923 until 1927 when he resigned in protest at Labour's opposition to sending troops to Shanghai. He unsuccessfully contested Wycombe in the 1931 election, but succeeded in Islington North at the 1937 by-election where he remained an MP until 1950 upon his elevation to the peerage.

Haden-Guest founded the Labour Party Commonwealth Group, and was a member of the Anderson Committee whose work led to the development of the Government's Evacuation Scheme during summer 1938.

During the Second World War Haden-Guest contributed to a social survey published by the Fabian Society regarding evacuation. He recommended that school meals and milk should be supplied irrespective of the financial circumstances of the parents. He argued that to discriminate on grounds of income would be 'socially and psychologically disastrous'.

Peerage
Haden-Guest was created a peer on 2 February 1950 as Baron Haden-Guest, of Saling in the County of Essex, and was a Lord-in-waiting to the King (February–October 1951), and thereafter an Assistant Opposition Whip in the House of Lords.

Personal life
In 1898, he married Edith, daughter of Max Low of London, by whom he had two sons, Stephen and Richard. The couple divorced in 1909 and in 1910 he married Muriel Carmel, the daughter of Albert Goldsmid. They had two sons, David, who was killed in the Spanish Civil War, and Peter; and a daughter, Angela. His third marriage was in 1944 to Edith Edgar MacQueen, daughter of George MacQueen, who was the first woman to be granted a Ph.D. by the University of St Andrews. He was the grandfather of actor, writer, director, and musician Christopher Guest, who is now the 5th Baron, as well as the writer Anthony Haden-Guest.

Haden-Guest converted to Judaism before his marriage to Muriel Goldsmid, his second wife. He "renounced Judaism" in 1924, describing himself subsequently as a "Konfessionslos". He was the first Jew to stand for Parliament as a Labour candidate.

Bertrand Russell described Haden-Guest as "a theosophist with a fiery temper and a considerable libido".

References

External links 
 
 
Parliamentary Archives, Papers of Leslie Haden Haden-Guest (1877-1960), 1st Baron Haden-Guest of Saling

1877 births
1960 deaths
British Army personnel of the Second Boer War
British Army personnel of World War I
Converts to Judaism
English Jews
Jewish British politicians
Labour Party (UK) MPs for English constituencies
Members of the Fabian Society
Members of London County Council
People educated at William Hulme's Grammar School
People from Oldham
Recipients of the Military Cross
Royal Army Medical Corps officers
UK MPs 1923–1924
UK MPs 1924–1929
UK MPs 1935–1945
UK MPs 1945–1950
UK MPs who were granted peerages
Labour Party (UK) hereditary peers
Leslie
Barons created by George VI
1
Ministers in the Attlee governments, 1945–1951